The 2010 State of the Nation Address is the first State of the Nation Address made by President Benigno Aquino III. This marked the first time the State of the Nation Address is delivered in Filipino language.

Seating and guests
Two former president of the Philippines, Joseph Estrada and Fidel Ramos were among the attendees of the SONA. Among those who also attended were Vice President Jejomar Binay, Chief Justice Renato Corona, and Papal Nuncio and Head of the Diplomatic Corps, Edward Joseph Adams. Former President and Aquino's predecessor, current Pampanga 2nd District Representative Gloria Macapagal-Arroyo skipped the event.

Address content and delivery
In his speech, Aquino revealed the problems he encountered upon assuming the presidency.

References

State of the Nation Address
State of the Nation Address
2010
Presidency of Benigno Aquino III
July 2010 events in the Philippines
Speeches by Benigno Aquino III